Tamambo, or Malo, is an Oceanic language spoken by 4,000 people on Malo and nearby islands in Vanuatu.

Phonology

Vowels

 become  respectively when unstressed and before another vowel.  may also become  for some speakers.

Consonants

The prenasalized postalveolar stop  is often affricated and voiceless, i.e. .

 is usually realized as  initially, but some speakers use .

Writing system
Few speakers of Tamambo are literate, and there is no standard orthography. Spelling conventions used include:

Pronouns and person markers
In Tamambo, personal pronouns distinguish between first, second, and third person. There is an inclusive and exclusive marking on the first-person plural and gender is not marked. There are four classes of pronouns, which is not uncommon in other Austronesian languages: 
Independent pronouns
Subject pronouns
Object pronouns
Possessive pronouns.

Independent pronouns
Independent pronouns behave grammatically similarly to other NPs in that they can occur in the same slot as a subject NP, functioning as the head of a NP. However, in regular discourse, they are not used a great deal due to the obligatory nature of cross-referencing subject pronouns. Use of independent pronouns is often seen as unnecessary and unusual except in the following situations:
Indicate person and number of conjoint NP
Introduce new referent
Reintroduce referent
Emphasise participation of known referent

Indicating person and number of conjoint NP
In the instance where two NPs are joined as a single subject, the independent pronoun reflects the number of the conjoint NP:

and

Thus, merging the two above clauses into one, the independent pronoun must change to reflect total number of subjects:

Introducing a new referent
When a new referent is introduced into the discourse, the independent pronoun is used. In this case, kamam:

Reintroduction of referent
In this example, the IP hinda in the second sentence is used to refer back to tahasi in the first sentence.

Emphasis on participation of known subject
According to Jauncey, this is the most common use of the IP. Comparing the two examples, the latter placing the emphasis on the subject:

and

Subject pronouns
Subject pronouns are an obligatory component of a verbal phrase, indicating the person and number of the NP. They can either co-occur with the NP or independent in the subject slot, or exist without if the subject has been deleted through ellipsis or previously known context.

Object pronouns
Object pronouns are very similar looking to independent pronouns, appearing to be abbreviations of the independent pronoun as seen in the pronoun paradigm above. Object pronouns behave similarly to the object NP, occurring in the same syntactic slot, however only one or the other is used, both cannot be used simultaneously as an object argument – which is unusual in Oceanic languages as many languages have obligatory object pronominal cross-referencing on the verb agreeing with NP object.

Possessive pronouns
Possessive pronouns substitute for NP possessor, suffixing to the possessed noun in direct possessive constructions or to one the four possessive classifiers in indirect constructions.

Direct possession

Indirect possession

Negation 
Negation in Tamambo involves the use of a negative particle; negative verb and negative aspectuals (semantics of time) to change positive constructions into negative ones.

Negation and the VP 
The negative particle -te and negative aspectual tele 'not yet' and lete 'never' can appear in the same slot of the Verb Phrase, illustrated below:

 
Both the negative aspectuals appear to be derived from the tense-aspect marker le and the negative particle -te. All the optional modifiers in the VP are mutually exclusive thus; the negative morphemes allow no modifiers between them and the head of the VP.

Negative particle -te 
The negative particle -te which expresses negative polarity on the verb is a bound morpheme, meaning it must be attached to the subject pronominal clitic. The negative particle also occurs immediately before the verb noted in example [105]. Furthermore, example [105] demonstrates what Jauncey terms a 'negative progressive'; a way of expressing the negative in the present tense such as 'he's not doing it' using the negative particle -te.

Negative aspectuals 
The negative aspectuals are used to refer to different aspects of time. The aspectual lete 'never' is used to refer to event times that are prior to speech time noted in example [107] and [100].

The negative aspectual tele 'not yet' is used only where the events are referring to an event time prior to or simultaneous with speech time noted in example [106] and [103].

Negation and modality 
In Tamambo, modality can be expressed through the future marker –mbo and the two 3SG subject pronouns, mo (realis) and a (irrealis). In Tamambo realis is 'the grammatical or lexical marking of an event time or situation that has happened (or not) or is happening (or not) relative to speech time' and irrealis refers to 'the grammatical or lexical marking of an event time or situation that may have happened, or that may or may not happen in the future'. In Tamambo, the negative particle -te and aspectual lete can be used in conjunction with the 3SG irrealis a to express that a situation or action is not known to have happened. This is used because the negative markers cannot occur next to the future marker –mbo, however they can occur separately in the same construction evident in example [101] containing lete.

In Tamambo, only the 3SG preverbal subject form has a irrealis, thus when -te is used with other preverbal subject pronouns, the time of event can be ambiguous, and phrases must be understood from context and other lexemes. For example, [98] illustrates the various interpretations one phrase may have.

Negative verb tete 
The negative verb tete is a part of Tamambo's closed subset of intransitive verbs, meaning that it has grammatical limitations. For example, the verb tete can only be used in conjunction with the 3SG preverbal subject pronominal clitic. The negative verb tete can function with a valency of zero or one. Valency refers to the number of syntactic arguments a verb can have.

Zero Valency 
The most common use of the verb tete is illustrated in example [59], where the verb has zero valency.

The 3SG pronoun's of a (irrealis) and mo (realis) are used in conjunction with tete to respond to varying questions depending on whether the answer is certain or not. Example [60] illustrates the use of a and tete in a construction to answer a question where the answer is not certain.

However, if the answer is certain than mo and tete are used highlighted in example [61].

Valency of one 
If tete functions with a valency of one, then the intransitive subject must precede the verb similar to a prototypical verb phrase. In this situation, 3SG marking can only represent both the singular and plural, highlighted in example [65].

Tete can also function with an 'existential meaning' illustrated in example [62], to express there was 'no one/no people'.

Ambient serial verb constructions 
The negative verb tete can also be used following a verb in an ambient serial verb construction. In Tamambo, a serial verb construction is defined by Jauncey as 'a sequence of two or more verbs that combine to function as a single predicate'. Furthermore, the term ambient in this verb construction refers to the phenomena when a verb, which follows a transitive or intransitive verb, makes a predication concerning the previous event rather than the participant. When the negative tete verb is used in an ambient serial verb construction, tete makes a negative predication regarding the event expressed by the previous verb highlighted in example [64] and [65]. Furthermore, in this instance it is ungrammatical to insert other words between the negative verb and the previous verb.

Negation and realis conditional sentences 
Negative realis conditional sentences express an idea that something will happen if the condition is not met, such as an imperative or warning. The sentence outlines the conditions, and includes an 'otherwise' or 'if not' component. The condition and the 'if not' (bolded) component occur together before the main clause illustrated in example [124].

Demonstratives 
Tamambo distinguishes between demonstrative pronouns, demonstrative adverbs and demonstrative modifiers.

Demonstrative pronouns 
Demonstrative pronouns occur in core argument slots, where they occur next to the predicate, can be relativised and can be fronted. These features distinguish them from demonstrative modifiers and demonstrative adverbs which may take the same form. Demonstrative pronouns in Tamambo include pronouns used for spatial deixis, anaphoric reference and emphatic reference. They do not change when referring to animate or inanimate entities.

Spatial deictics 
Demonstrative pronouns are organised into a two-way framework, which is based on the distance relative to the speaker and the addressee. While it is common for Oceanic languages to have a distinction based on distance from the speaker, the two-way organisation is unusual for Oceanic languages, where demonstratives usually have a three-way distinction. These pronouns refer to entities which both the speaker and the addressee can see.

niani 
The pronoun niani 'this one' refers to an entity which is near the speaker.

niala 
The pronoun niala 'that one over there' refers to an entity that is further away from both the speaker and the addressee.

Nirala, which translates to 'those ones over there', is used in colloquial speech as a plural form of niala .

Anaphoric reference 
Tamambo, like many other Oceanic languages and possibly Proto-Oceanic, includes a demonstrative system which functions to reference previous discourse. Tamambo includes two pronouns used for anaphora, mwende and mwe, which are only used for anaphora without any marking for person or distance, a common feature of Oceanic languages.

mwende 
The pronoun mwende 'the particular one, the particular ones' can function as either a proform or a noun phrase. As shown in example (3) below, mwende is used for a singular noun, specifying which particular knife is the better one, whereas in example (4), the same pronoun, mwende, is referring to multiple 'ones'.

Emphatic reference 
Tamambo includes the demonstrative pronoun, niaro, used for emphasis, as shown in example (5).

Demonstrative adverbs

Spatial modifiers 
Spatial modifier adverbs in Tamambo are sentential, and cannot occur within the proposition. There are three sets of spatial modifiers, which are shown in the table below. These three sets of spatial modifiers can be organised into three groups depending on the distance from the speaker, a trait common to demonstratives in Oceanic languages. The following table shows the three sets of spatial modifiers in Tamambo. In this arrangement by Kaufman, the formatives -ni, -e, and -la can be seen to correlate with distance from the speaker.

aien and aie 
These adverbs begin with ai-, which suggests that they are related to a locative proform in Proto-Oceanic, *ai-. Aien can mean either 'in this place', referring to a location, as shown in example (6), or used for anaphoric reference, where it can mean 'at this stage of events', as shown in example (7). Aien refers to location in place or time more generally than another spatial modifier, roni.

Aie refers to 'another place which is not visible', or may be used for a place which has already been introduced earlier in conversation, as shown in example (8).

roni and rola 
Roni is used to refer to a place visible to both the speaker and the listener, and is more specific than aien. It translates to 'right here close to me'.

Rola is an old word for 'there' which is rarely used, and is said to have come from the east. In her research, Jauncey reports no examples of rola being used in narrative or conversation but provides the example below.

niani, niae and niala 
These adverbs share the same forms as demonstrative pronouns and modifiers, but they occur at different parts of the sentence and perform different functions. These adverbs refer to places which are visible and in addition, the speaker will point. Niala and niani are not used for anaphoric reference. The nia- component of this set of demonstratives suggests a relationship to the Proto-Austronesian proximate demonstrative, which contains *ni. In addition, the pointing gesture which commonly accompanies the adverbs niani, niae and niala can be derived from the demonstrative function of the Proto-Austronesian component *ni.

Niani translates to 'here', where the referenced entity is close to the speaker, as shown in example (11).

Niae translates to 'there near you', where the referenced entity is close to the addressee, shown in example (12) below.

Niala translates as 'there' or 'over there', and refers to a place that can be seen or a close place that cannot be seen.

Demonstrative modifiers 
Demonstrative modifiers are a non-obligatory component of the noun phrase in Tamambo. In Tamambo, demonstrative modifiers function within the noun phrase, after the head noun to modify it. In languages spoken in Vanuatu, and Oceanic languages more generally, the demonstrative commonly follows the head noun. In Proto-Oceanic, this also seems to be the case for adnominal demonstratives. Demonstrative modifiers in Tamambo include spatial reference, anaphoric reference and emphatic reference uses.

Spatial reference 
These demonstratives have a three-way distinction, based on distance relative to the speaker. They can occur following the head directly, as shown in example (14), or follow a descriptive adjective, as shown in example (15). The same forms are used as demonstrative pronouns, however niae is not used as a pronoun. The modifiers are the same for singular and plural nouns.

niani 
Niani translates to 'this' or 'these' and references something close to the speaker.

In example (14), niani is modifying mwende, the demonstrative pronoun, which is the head.

In this example, the demonstrative modifier niani follows directly after the descriptive adjective tawera, which in turn follows the head noun jara.

niae 
Niae refers to something that is close to the addressee, and translates to 'that' or 'those'.

In example (16), the demonstrative modifier niani directly follows the after the noun samburu.

niala 
Niala references something that is distant from both the speaker and the addressee.

In example (17), the demonstrative modifier niala follows directly after the first tamalohi, which is the person the speaker is referring to.

Anaphoric referential markers 
Tamambo includes two anaphoric referential modifiers, rindi and mwende. Both are used posthead.

rindi 
Rindi indicates a noun phrase which has been already introduced in either a preceding clause or earlier string of narrative or conversation, and limits the reference of an entity that has already been introduced. 

In example (18), vavine has already been introduced at an earlier stage of the conversation, therefore rindi is used directly following the noun vavine when it is reintroduced.

mwende 
Mwende is more specific than rindi and indicates a referent which is definitely known.

The demonstrative modifier mwende follows the tamalohi, the noun.

Emphatic reference modifier 
Niaro is the only emphatic reference modifier, which can also only occur posthead as shown in example (20).

Niaro can occur with the anaphoric referential modifier rindi, and in that circumstance, rindi is shortened to ri, as shown in example (21) below. Both modifiers follow after the noun Kastom, with the anaphoric reference marker preceding the emphatic reference modifier.

Abbreviations 

TA:tense-aspect marker
REP:repeating action
LINK:possessive linker
REF:prior reference made

References

External links 
 Materials on Malo are included in the open access Arthur Capell collections (AC1 and AC2) held by Paradisec.

Bibliography
 Dryer, M. (2013). Feature 88A: Order of Demonstrative and Noun. Retrieved 28 March 2021, from https://wals.info/feature/88A#2/16.3/152.9

 
 
Kaufman, Daniel. (2013) “Tamambo, a Language of Malo, Vanuatu by Dorothy G. Jauncey (Review).” Oceanic Linguistics, 52(1): 277–290. http://www.jstor.org/stable/43286771
 
Ross, Malcolm. (2004) Demonstratives, local nouns and directionals in Oceanic languages: a diachronic perspective, in Gunter Senft (ed.), Deixis and demonstratives in Oceanic Languages, Pacific Linguistics, Canberra, pp. 175 - 204 

Espiritu Santo languages
Languages of Vanuatu